Canada competed at the 1998 Winter Olympics in Nagano, Japan. Canada has competed at every Winter Olympic Games.

Canada's biggest story at these games was the failure of the men's ice hockey team to win a medal. For the first time, Canada's best players (professional players from the National Hockey League) were able to compete at the Olympics, so Canadians had high expectations. The team lost its semi-final game to the Czech Republic when goaltender Dominik Hašek stopped all five shots he faced in the tie-breaking shootout. Canada then lost the bronze medal game to Finland.

The women's ice hockey team, on the other hand, captured a silver medal in the first Games to feature the women's event.

For the first time, curling was included as an official event, having been showcased as a demonstration sport at Calgary in 1988, and Albertville in 1992.

Also making the news was Ross Rebagliati's disqualification for marijuana being found in his system and having his gold medal stripped. The IOC reinstated the medal days later.

Medalists

Alpine skiing

Men

Men's combined

Women

Women's combined

Biathlon

Men

Women

Women's 4 × 7.5 km relay

 1 A penalty loop of 150 metres had to be skied per missed target.
 2 One minute added per missed target.

Bobsleigh

Cross-country skiing

Men

 1 Starting delay based on 10 km results. 
 C = Classical style, F = Freestyle

Men's 4 × 10 km relay

Women

 2 Starting delay based on 5 km results. 
 C = Classical style, F = Freestyle

Women's 4 × 5 km relay

Curling

Men's tournament

Group stage
Top four teams advanced to semi-finals.

|}

Medal round
Semi-final

Gold medal match

Women's tournament

Group stage
Top four teams advanced to semi-finals.

|}

Medal round
Semi-final

Gold medal match

Figure skating

Men

Pairs

Ice dancing

Freestyle skiing

Men

Women

Ice hockey

Men's tournament

Group C

Quarter-final

{{hockeybox2
| bg          = #EEEEEE
| date        = 18 February 1998
| team1       = 
| team2       = | score       = 4 – 1
| periods     = (2-1, 2-0, 0-0)
| stadium     = The Big Hat/ Aqua Wing Arena, Nagano, Japan
| attendance  = 9,602
}}

Semi-final

Bronze medal gameTeam rosterMartin Brodeur
Patrick Roy
Curtis Joseph
Ray Bourque
Al MacInnis
Rob Blake
Adam Foote
Éric Desjardins
Chris Pronger
Scott Stevens
Eric Lindros
Joe Nieuwendyk
Theoren Fleury
Wayne Gretzky
Keith Primeau
Joe Sakic
Rod Brind'Amour
Brendan Shanahan
Shayne Corson
Steve Yzerman
Mark Recchi
Rob Zamuner
Trevor LindenHead coach''': Marc Crawford

Women's tournament

Group stage
The first 4 teams (shaded green) advanced to medal round games.

|}

Gold medal game

Luge

Men

Short track speed skating

Men

Women

Snowboarding

Men's giant slalom

Men's halfpipe

Women's halfpipe

Speed skating

Men

Women

Official outfitter

 Roots Canada became the official outfitter of clothing for members of the Canadian Olympic team. The same clothing was also sold at Roots stores in Canada.

References

 Olympic Winter Games 1998, full results by sports-reference.com

Nations at the 1998 Winter Olympics
1998
Winter Olympics